The Eagles games were first broadcast in 1939 on WCAU and have been continuously broadcast since. Beginning with the 2008 season, Eagles games were broadcast on both WYSP (now WIP-FM) and Sports Radio 610 WIP, as both stations were owned and operated by CBS Radio. Merrill Reese, who joined the Eagles in the mid-1970s, is the play-by-play announcer, and former Eagles wide receiver Mike Quick is the color analyst. Former Eagles linebacker Bill Bergey is among several Eagles post-game commentators on the FM. 

Most preseason games are televised on WCAU, the local NBC owned and operated station. Television announcers for these preseason games are Scott Graham and Ross Tucker.

Eagles radio announcers

 
Philadelphia Eagles
CBS Radio Sports
broadcasters